Carlos Eduardo Xavier Marun (born 21 November 1960 in Porto Alegre) is a Brazilian politician, member of the Chamber of Deputies, lawyer and civil engineer. He is part of the Brazilian Democratic Movement Party (PMDB). Currently, is Secretary of Government, nominated by president Michel Temer.

While Eduardo Cunha was president of the Chamber of Deputies, Marun was one of his chief deputies in the chamber. He filled this position along with other deputies, such as Paulinho da Força, Waldir Maranhão and André Moura. During the session that later expelled the former president of the Chamber, he was the only one who defended Cunha from being expelled. After the session that archived the complaint against president Michel Temer, Marun danced saying that "everything is in its place, thank God", mentioning a song from Brazilian singer Benito di Paula, and that they "once again overcame the opposition, which can't win anything".

On 22 November 2017, Marun was announced as the new Chief Minister of the Secretary of Government, replacing Antônio Imbassahy. Later the same day, the nomination was suspended. Was nominated again after the resignation of Imbassahy on 8 December 2017.

References

External links
 
 Deputado Carlos Marun, Chamber of Deputies

1960 births
Living people
Government ministers of Brazil
People from Rio Grande do Sul
People from Porto Alegre
Brazilian Democratic Movement politicians
Members of the Chamber of Deputies (Brazil) from Mato Grosso do Sul